Toutai Kefu (born 8 April 1974) is a Tonga-born rugby coach, who earned 60 caps playing at number eight for the Australian national team (the Wallabies). Kefu is currently the head coach of the Tongan national team having previously coached them as a caretaker in 2012. He is also the Assistant Coach of the First 15 at Iona College. He is additionally the head coach of the Australian side Queensland Country in the National Rugby Championship, while there is a break between international windows.

Playing career
Big, quick and powerfully built, he was a stand out school boy performer, being selected for the Queensland Reds for the inaugural season of the Super 12 in 1996, aged 21. He made his international test debut for Australia at the age of 23, coming off the bench against South Africa on 23 August during the 1997 Tri Nations Series. He made his first start on his second cap almost a year later. He took over the position of number 8 from fellow Tongan Willie Ofahengaue in 1998 in Australia's record 76–0 win over England. After helping Australia qualify for the 1999 Rugby World Cup in September 1998, he played a vital role in winning the Webb Ellis Cup for Australia's second time. He played in 4 of their matches, scoring against Romania in the opening game, 
and playing the full 80 minutes in the final.

He helped Australia to their first ever Tri-nations title in 2000, which saw the Wallabies win their third consecutive Bledisloe Cup title, the first ever time they had done this. In 2001, he helped Australia to their first series win over the British and Irish Lions in over 70 years, playing in all three tests. Later that year he scored the try which beat the All Blacks to retain the Bledisloe Cup, giving his Skipper, John Eales, a perfect send off, as this was his last game for the Wallabies.

After failing to make the 2003 Rugby World Cup squad, Kefu signed with Kubota Spears in the Top League in Japan, leaving the Queensland Reds after earning 103 caps for his state. In the six season Kefu was with the Japanese club, Kubota Spears failed to move from the midsection of the table, only getting as high as fifth in the 2009–10 Top League season. Following the 2009–10 season, Kefu retired from playing rugby.

In 2006, Kefu represented the Barbarians, playing against England at Twickenham Stadium, with England winning 46–19.

Honours

Rugby World Cup / Webb Ellis Cup
Winner: 1999
Tri Nations Series
Winner: 2000, 2001
Runner-up: 1998, 1999, 2002, 2003
Bledisloe Cup
Winner: 1998, 1999, 2000, 2001, 2002
Mandela Challenge Plate
Winner: 2000
Tom Richards Cup
Winner: 2001

Puma Trophy
Winner: 2002
Trophée des Bicentenaires
Winner: 1998, 2000, 2002
Cook Cup
Winner: June 1998, Nov 1998, 1999
Hopetoun Cup
Winner: 1998, 2000
Lansdowne Cup
Winner: 1999

Coaching career
In 2010 Kefu became head coach of the Sunshine Coast Stingrays, a team in the Queensland Premier League. In his first season in charge, he led the Stingrays to the Senior Championship title, defeating Gold Coast 37–12 in the final. Kefu continued on to coach the Stingrays, but temporarily left the side in 2011 to take up the role of assistant coach for the Tongan national team in preparation for the 2011 Rugby World Cup. He helped Tonga to second in the 2011 IRB Pacific Nations Cup, their best positioning since the tournament was formed in 2006. It saw Tonga earn their first victory over Fiji since 2008, winning 45–21, their largest winning margin over the Flying Fijians. In addition to this, they beat Samoa 29–19, which was their first victory over Manu Samoa since 2007. Their only loss came to Japan going down narrowly 28–27. During the World Cup, Tonga earned two victories, beating Japan 31–18 and beating France 19–14 for the first time since 1999. However, the two wins were not enough to progress Tonga further in the tournament.

In 2012, following Isitolo Maka resignation as Tongan head coach, Kefu acted as interim head coach for the 2012 IRB Pacific Nations Cup. He guided Tonga to a sole victory, beating Japan in Tokyo 24–20. In September 2012, Mana Otai was named the full coach.

Following his leave from the Tongan national team, Kefu became the head coach of his former club Kubota Spears in Japan. They had dropped to the Eastern A League. He had recruited high-profile players including Kurt Morath and Hoani Matenga, and brought in young Japanese players. Kefu led the team to promotion for the 2013–14 Top League season, and in his second year in charge, he led his side to top of Group 2, though failed to make it past the Wildcard play-offs, after losing to NEC Green Rockets 47–10. Unfortunately, in the 2014–15 Top League season, Kubota Spears finished fifth in their group which meant they played in the Promotion and relegation play-offs. They played Kamaishi Seawaves on 14 February 2015, where they secured a 34–5 victory to remain in the Top League for the 2015–16 Top League season. Following another poor season in 2015/16, Kefu left the club at the end of the season.

In August 2016, just three months after being appointed head coach of Tonga, Kefu was named the head coach of Queensland Country for the 2016 National Rugby Championship in Australia. Kefu was only able to lead his side to a single victory during their campaign, coming against finalist and table leaders New South Wales Country Eagles 40–38. This meant Queensland Country finished bottom of the table on 7 points.

Head coach of Tonga
On 6 May 2016, Kefu was announced as the Tongan national team's head coach, replacing Mana Otai after Tonga failed to automatically qualify for the 2019 Rugby World Cup due to finishing fourth in their pool at the 2015 Rugby World Cup. Kefu started his reign as Tongan head coach with a 23–18 loss to Fiji, though Tonga did lead the Fijians 15–0 at half time. A week later, he led his side to a 23–20 loss to Georgia, before going down to Samoa 30–10. Tonga finished last in the 2016 World Rugby Pacific Nations Cup, placing them bottom of the table - putting them in a disadvantage ahead of the 2017 tournament, where they will need to win both matches to qualify for the 2019 Rugby World Cup. Kefu gained his first win against Spain during the 2016 end-of-year internationals, where they won 28–13 in the first ever meeting between the two nations. A week later, Tonga defeated the United States 20–17 before going on to win against Tier 1 side Italy 19–17. This was Tonga's first win over Italy since 1999 and their first win over a Tier 1 nation since beating Scotland in 2012.

In June 2017, Kefu named a squad that included 15 uncapped players in an attempt to increase depth in the national team of players playing in elite rugby in various countries. On 16 June, 7 players earned their debut in Tonga's 24–6 loss to Wales at Eden Park. Two weeks late, Kefu led Tonga into their first home game since 2009 - against Samoa in the first round of the 2017 World Rugby Pacific Nations Cup. Despite a late come back from Samoa, Tonga earned their first victory over Samoa (30–26) since 2011, in a game that included 2 further debutantes. The following week saw Fiji down Tonga for the sixth consecutive time, losing 14–10. Tonga had a promising starts to the End-of-year tour, narrowly losing to invitational side Barbarians, 27–24, in the first ever match between the two sides. Unfortunately, they were unable to continue their form from that match in to their second match on tour, losing to Japan 39–6, a record defeat for the Tongan's against Japan. Tonga's third match on tour ended in a victory, defeating Romania 25–20.

The 2018 World Rugby Pacific Nations Cup saw Tonga maintain their position as the second ranked Pacific Nation behind Fiji. In the opening round of the PNC, Tonga lost to newly invited Georgia 16–15, but went onto to defeat Samoa 28–18 in round 2. Despite there only being two rounds of the PNC, Tonga later went onto to beat Fiji in Lautoka 27–19, in a one-off test match - it was the first time since 2011 that Tonga had defeated Fiji in Fiji. The start of the World Cup year saw Tonga finish in fifth place during the 2019 World Rugby Pacific Nations Cup, winning just once, beating Canada 33–23.

Honours
World Rugby Pacific Nations Cup
Runners-up: 2017, 2018

Personal life 
Kefu is married to his wife Rachel and they have an adult son and daughter and live in Coorparoo, a suburb of Brisbane.

On 16 August 2021 Kefu and his family were allegedly the victims of a violent home invasion in which all four family members were seriously injured and required surgery. Reportedly the Kefus were at home when three people broke in and a brawl erupted during which Kefu was stabbed in the liver and abdomen. Kefu told reporters that his son showed no fear as he helped him to fight off two of the alleged attackers. “He absolutely went into beast mode,” Kefu said. A 15-year-old male was charged with four counts of attempted murder, three counts of assault causing grievous bodily harm and one count each of unlawful use of a motor vehicle, breaking and entering, burglary and deprivation of liberty. This prompted statements of support from the rugby community both in Australia and overseas.

References

External links 
 Toutai Kefu photos & stats on Sporting Heroes
 

1974 births
Tongan rugby union players
Tongan emigrants to Australia
Australian rugby union coaches
Australian rugby union players
Australia international rugby union players
Queensland Reds players
Living people
Rugby union number eights
Expatriate rugby union players in Japan
Australian expatriate rugby union players
Australian expatriate sportspeople in Japan
Kubota Spears Funabashi Tokyo Bay players
Tonga national rugby union team coaches
Tongan rugby union coaches
Tongan expatriate rugby union players
Tongan expatriate sportspeople in Japan